Olivia Côte is a French actress.

Filmography

Actress

Writer

Theater

References

External links
 

French film actresses
Living people
21st-century French actresses
French television actresses
Year of birth missing (living people)